The US Model 1842 Musket was a .69 caliber musket manufactured and used in the United States during the 19th Century. It is a continuation of the Model 1816 line of muskets but is generally referred to as its own model number rather than just a variant of the Model 1816.

The Model 1842 was the last U.S. smoothbore musket. Many features that had been retrofitted into the Model 1840 were standard on the Model 1842. The Model 1842 was the first primary U.S. muskets to be produced with a percussion lock; however, most of the Model 1840 flintlocks ended up being converted to percussion locks before reaching the field. The percussion cap system was vastly superior to the flintlock, being much more reliable and much more resistant to weather.

A great emphasis was placed on manufacturing processes for the Model 1842. It was the first small arm produced in the U.S. with fully interchangeable (machine-made) parts. Approximately 275,000 Model 1842 muskets were produced at manufactured at the Springfield and Harper's Ferry armories between 1844 and 1855. Model 1842 muskets were also made by private contractors. However, these were few in number. Some were made by A.H. Waters and B. Flagg & Co, both of Millbury, Massachusetts. These were distinguished by having brass furniture instead of iron. A.H. Waters went out of business due to a lack of contracts in New England, and Flagg entered into a partnership with William Glaze of South Carolina. They relocated the machinery to the Palmetto Armory in Columbia, South Carolina. Instead of "V" over "P" over the eagle's head, these guns were usually stamped "P" over "V" over the palmetto tree. Most of the output of the Palmetto Armory went to the state militia of South Carolina. There were only 6,020 1842 type muskets produced on that contract and none were made there after 1853.

Like the earlier Model 1840, the Model 1842 was produced with an intentionally thicker barrel than necessary, with the assumption that it would likely be rifled later. As the designers anticipated, many of the Model 1842 muskets had their barrels rifled later so that they could fire the newly developed Minié ball. Tests conducted by the U.S. Army showed that the .69 caliber musket was not as accurate as the smaller bore rifled muskets. Also, the Minié Ball, being conical and longer than it was broad, had much more mass than a round ball of the same caliber. A smaller caliber Minié ball could be used to provide as much mass on target as the larger .69 caliber round ball. For these reasons, the Model 1842 was the last .69 caliber musket. The Army later standardized on the .58 caliber Minié Ball, as used in the Springfield Model 1855 and Springfield Model 1861.

Both the original smoothbore version and the modified rifled version of the Model 1842 were used in the American Civil War. The smoothbore version was produced without sights (except for a cast one on the barrel band). When Model 1842 muskets were modified to have rifled barrels, sights were usually added at the same time as the rifling.

The 1842 musket was effectively used during the American Civil War.

See also
 List of individual weapons of the U.S. Armed Forces
 List of wars involving the United States
 Military history of the United States
 United States Army
 Confederate States Army
 Charleville musket
 Brown Bess
 Potzdam Musket 1723
 M1752 Musket
 Springfield musket
 Musket
 Rifle
 Carbine
 American Civil War reenactment

References

External links

Article about M1842 Musket
 "Civil War Weapons and Equipment" by Russ A. Pritchard, Jr., Russ A. Pritchard Jr., Published by Globe Pequot, 2003
 http://www.nps.gov/spar/historyculture/sa-firearms-questions.htm Springfield Armory Weapons Research

Rifled muskets
American Civil War rifles
Springfield firearms